The Battle of Motovilivka was a military engagement fought between forces of the Ukrainian State and the Directorate of Ukraine. The battle took place on 18 November 1918 during the Ukrainian Civil War, and resulted in a major victory for the Directorate. The battle resulted in the eventual collapse of the Ukrainian State in December 1918.

Background  
Following the Russian Revolution and the breakup of the Russian Empire, an extended period of social and political unrest erupted in the former Russian Ukraine. With the First World War raging in Europe, the Central Power member nations of Germany and Austria Hungary sought to take advantage of the civil discord in the former Russian Empire by gaining control of the Ukraine's reserves of wheat. A joint German-Austrian army invaded the Ukraine in February 1918, defeated a disorganized force of Bolshevik soldiers and militia units, and forced the signing of the Treaty of Brest-Litovsk. Among other conditions, the treaty placed the Ukraine in Germany's political and economic orbit. The acting government of the Ukraine, the Ukrainian People's Republic, acquiesced to the German terms, though a number of small militant groups actively resisted the Germans. However, none of the various militant groups operating against the Germans were capable of effectively holding territory in the face of the overwhelmingly superior German army.

On 29 April 1918 a former General of the Imperial Russian Army, Pavlo Skoropadskyi, orchestrated a coup that succeeded in dissolving the Central Council of the republic and enthroning himself as the Hetman of the new Ukrainian State. The new government was supported by Germany, which desperately needed Ukraine's food supplies and sought to create a postwar buffer state between Germany and any nation-states that would arise in Russia. In addition to tying the new Ukrainian monarchy to the German Empire, Skoropadskyi also repealed a number of the Central Council's socialist policies, actions which in turn caused a number of pro-Bolshevik factions to revolt against the government. These factions gained momentum when the First World War came to an end on 11 November 1918, depriving the Ukrainian State of the majority of Germany's support. On 13 November a number of rebel factions formed the Directorate of Ukraine (also referred to as the Ukrainian National Union) to oppose the weakened Skoropadskyi government. The Directorate formed an army and moved against Kyiv.

The majority of the Directorate's forces were peasant militia from pro-Bolshevik or anti-Hetman Green armies. These militias were supplemented by the Sich Riflemen, a unit of professional Ukrainian soldiers that had formerly been disarmed and disbanded by the Skoropadskyi regime. The forces of the Ukrainian State were made up of former Russian troops, anti-Bolshevik militia, and a small contingent of German military advisers.

Battle 
On 15 November 1918 advance forces of the Directorate's army began to move towards Kyiv from the southwest. To counter this action, a force of 700 Hetman soldiers moved to intercept the Directorate forces near the town of Vasylkiv. The Hetman forces deployed themselves near a train station at Motovilivka. Intelligence of the Hetman deployment at Motovilivka made its way to forward elements of the Sich Riflemen under the command of Captain Fyodor Chernik. In response, Chernik launched an immediate attack against the Hetman forces, hoping to punch through their defenses and take Vasylkiv. His detachment of 300 men attacked the left, right, and center of the Hetman force early on the morning of 18 November. The Hetman army counterattacked, pinning down the Directorate army's left flank. The Directorate forces held, but sustained several dozen casualties, including Chernik. On the Directorate's right flank, a force of 50 Sich Riflemen took cover in a wooded area from which they repelled several attacks by a large force of several hundred Hetman soldiers. In addition, both sides utilized armored trains during the battle to provide fire support for their respective forces. By midday the Hetman army's attack had begun to weaken, and Directorate reinforcements began to arrive on the field. Soon the Directorate left was able to outflank the Hetman right flank, sending the army into a retreat. The Hetman army counterattacked with their reserve forces and with an armored train, but one of the Directorate's armored trains landed an artillery shot on the Hetman train, forcing it to withdraw. The Hetman counterattack failed, and by 3:00 PM the Directorate forces held the field.

Casualties 
The Directorate forces suffered 17 killed and several dozen wounded in the battle, while the Hetman forces sustained 700 casualties.

Aftermath 
Following their victory at Motovilivka, the Directorate forces advanced on and captured Vasylkiv. The Hetman force retreated to Darnytsia. Over the next several weeks the Directorate forces moved closer to Kyiv, and on 14 December Skoropadskyi fled to Berlin. This flight marked the end of the Ukrainian State.

References

1918 in Ukraine
Motovilivka
History of Kyiv Oblast
Ukrainian People's Republic
Ukrainian State
Ukrainian War of Independence
Motovilivka